Caulerpa serrulata, commonly known as cactus tree alga or serrated green seaweed, is a species of seaweed in the Caulerpaceae family found in warm marine water environments.

Description
It has small blades that have serrated edges and grow upward from long, cylindrically shaped runners anchored to the substrate. The blades are often forked and less frequently twisted. The blades are light to medium mint green in colour, frequently with bluish tints.

Distribution
The species is found in intertidal and subtidal zones in tropical waters. It is found in the Caribbean from south Florida and around the Bahamas. In Western Australia, it is found along the coast in the Kimberley region extending south to the Gascoyne. It is also found around India, Singapore and other parts of south east Asia and the east coast of Africa.

Uses
This seaweed is said to be edible and is used to lower blood pressure and as an antibacterial and antifungal agent in medicines.

References

serrulata
Plants described in 1837